List of works by or about Garry Wills, American historian and journalist.

 
 Animals of the Bible (1962)
 Politics and Catholic Freedom (1964)
 Roman Culture: Weapons and the Man (1966), 
 The Second Civil War: Arming for Armageddon (1968)
 Jack Ruby (1968), 
 Nixon Agonistes: The Crisis of the Self-made Man (1970, 1979), 
 Bare Ruined Choirs: Doubt, Prophecy, and Radical Religion (1972), 
 Values Americans Live By (1973), 
 Inventing America: Jefferson's Declaration of Independence (1978), 
 Confessions of a Conservative (1979), 
 At Button's (1979), 
 Explaining America: The Federalist (1981), 
 The Kennedy Imprisonment: A Meditation on Power (1982), 
 Lead Time: A Journalist's Education (1983), 
 Cincinnatus: George Washington and the Enlightenment (1984), 
 Reagan's America: Innocents at Home (1987), 
 Under God: Religion and American Politics (1990), 
 Lincoln at Gettysburg: The Words That Remade America (1992), 
 Certain Trumpets: The Call of Leaders (1994), 
 Witches and Jesuits: Shakespeare's Macbeth (1995), 
 John Wayne's America: The Politics of Celebrity (1997), 
 
 Saint Augustine (1999), 
 Saint Augustine's Childhood (2001), 
 Saint Augustine's Memory (2002), 
 Saint Augustine's Sin (2003), 
 Saint Augustine's Conversion (2004), 
 A Necessary Evil: A History of American Distrust of Government (1999), 
 Papal Sin: Structures of Deceit (2000), 
 Venice: Lion City: The Religion of Empire (2001), 
 Why I Am a Catholic (2002), 
 Mr. Jefferson's University (2002), 
 James Madison (2002), 
 Negro President: Jefferson and the Slave Power (2003), 
 Henry Adams and the Making of America (2005), 
 The Rosary: Prayer Comes Round (2005), 
 What Jesus Meant (2006), 
 What Paul Meant (2006), 
 Bush's Fringe Government (2006), 
 Head and Heart: American Christianities (2007), 
 What the Gospels Meant (2008), 
 Bomb Power (2010), 
 Outside Looking In: Adventures of an Observer (2010), 
 Augustine's 'Confessions': A Biography (2011), 
 Verdi's Shakespeare: Men of the Theater (2011), 
 Rome and Rhetoric: Shakespeare's Julius Caesar (2011), 
 Font of Life: Ambrose, Augustine, and the Mystery of Baptism (2012), 
 Why Priests? (2013), 
 The Future of the Catholic Church with Pope Francis (March 2015), 
 What The Qur'an Meant and Why It Matters (2017), 

Bibliographies by writer
Bibliographies of American writers